= The Idiot Brain =

2016 book by Dean Burnett

- First edition
- Author: Dean Burnett
- Language: English
- Subject: Neuroscience; Comedy
- Publisher: Guardian Faber Publishing
- Publication date: 16 February 2016
- Publication place: United Kingdom
- Media type: Print (hardback)
- Pages: 335
- ISBN: 9780571350834

The Idiot Brain is a 2016 science book by comedian and neuroscientist Dean Burnett. The book was published in the United Kingdom by Faber and Faber. It was shortlisted for the 2016 Goodreads Best Science & Technology Book Award.

== Reception ==
Critical reception for The Idiot Brain has been positive, with The Independent describing it as "a wonderful introduction to neuroscience." and The Wall Street Journal as "Entertaining…[A] grand tour around modern cognitive science and psychology."
